Sezny Le Roux (18 June 1914 – 29 August 1983) was a French racing cyclist. He rode in the 1935 Tour de France.

References

1914 births
1983 deaths
French male cyclists
Place of birth missing